October Road, a television drama series created by André Nemec, Scott Rosenberg and Josh Appelbaum, premiered on March 15, 2007 on ABC network in the United States and ended on March 10, 2008. The show spans two seasons of 19 episodes. All episodes were approximately 41 minutes long excluding commercials. ABC decided to cancel the series due to declining ratings in the second season.

Both seasons of October Road were released on DVD in United States in 2007 and 2009, respectively. Following the show's cancellation, the writers wrote an additional 15-minute episode concluding the events of the series finale. The episode was filmed and is featured on the second season DVD.

October Road follows Nick Garrett, a man returning to his hometown 10 years after he had left it to go backpacking to Europe but never returned. After leaving all of his friends and family behind, Nick now has to face the changes and the ghosts from his past. The series stars Bryan Greenberg as Nick, Laura Prepon as Hannah Daniels, Warren Christie as Ray Cataldo, Geoff Stults as Eddie Latekka, Tom Berenger as Bob Garrett, Rebecca Field as Janet Meadows, Brad William Henke as Owen Rowan, Evan Jones as "Ikey," Jay Paulson as "Physical Phil," Slade Pearce as Sam Daniels, Odette Yustman as Aubrey Diaz, and Lindy Booth as "Pizza Girl."

Series overview

Episodes

Season 1 (2007)

Season 2 (2007–08)

References

External links
 Full episodes of October Road from AOL
 

Lists of American drama television series episodes